Riley Patrick Meredith (born 21 June 1996) is an Australian cricketer. He made his international debut for the Australia cricket team in March 2021.

Domestic and T20 career
Meredith made his List A debut for Cricket Australia XI against Pakistanis during their tour of Australia on 10 January 2017. He made his first-class debut for Tasmania in the 2017–18 Sheffield Shield season on 13 November 2017. He made his Twenty20 debut for the Hobart Hurricanes in the 2017–18 Big Bash League season on 1 February 2018.

In February 2021, Meredith was bought by Punjab Kings ahead of the 2021 Indian Premier League. In February 2022, he was bought by the Mumbai Indians in the auction for the 2022 Indian Premier League tournament.

In April 2022, he was bought by the London Spirit for the 2022 season of The Hundred.

International career
On 16 July 2020, Meredith was named in a 26-man preliminary squad of players to begin training ahead of a possible tour to England following the COVID-19 pandemic. On 14 August 2020, Cricket Australia confirmed that the fixtures would be taking place, with Meredith included in the touring party.

In January 2021, Meredith was named in Australia's Twenty20 International (T20I) squad for their series against New Zealand, going on to make his international debut on 3 March. In June 2021, Meredith was named in Australia's limited overs squad for their tours of the West Indies and Bangladesh. Meredith made his One Day International (ODI) debut on 22 July 2021, for Australia against the West Indies. However, the match was suspended after the toss took place, following a positive test for COVID-19 from a non-playing member of the West Indies team. As the match was suspended, and not abandoned, play resumed two days later after the fixtures were rescheduled following no further COVID-19 cases.

References

External links
 

1996 births
Living people
Australian cricketers
Australia One Day International cricketers
Australia Twenty20 International cricketers
Cricket Australia XI cricketers
Hobart Hurricanes cricketers
Punjab Kings cricketers
Tasmania cricketers
Cricketers from Hobart
Mumbai Indians cricketers